Chittagainga Powa Noakhailla Maiya is a Bangladeshi romantic comedy film directed by Uttam Akash. The film was produced by Selim Khan and production house was Shapla Media. The film stars Shakib Khan, and Shabnom Bubly in lead roles, along with Moushumi, Omar Sunny, Kazi Hayat, Sadek Bachchu supporting roles.

Plot

Cast
 Shakib Khan as Anzam
 Shabnom Bubly as Riya
 Moushumi
 Omar Sani
 DJ Shohel
 
 Kazi Hayat
 Sadek Bachchu

Production

Soundtrack

Awards

References 

2018 films
Bengali-language Bangladeshi films
2018 comedy-drama films
2010s Bengali-language films
Films scored by Akassh
Shapla Media films